The Gold Coast Stingrays are an American football (gridiron) team competing in the Gridiron Queensland league. They are located in Nerang, Queensland on the Gold Coast. The Stingrays are currently the most successful team in the league with 14 Sunbowl wins and 4 losses.

See also
Gridiron Queensland

References

External links

American football teams in Queensland
American football teams established in 1987
1987 establishments in Australia
Sporting teams based on the Gold Coast, Queensland